Donal Moynihan (2 October 1941 – 29 October 2022) was an Irish Fianna Fáil politician who served as a Teachta Dála (TD) for the Cork North-West constituency from 1982 to 1989 and 1992 to 2007.

Moynihan was born in Ballymakeera, County Cork, in 1941. He was educated at Ballyvourney Vocational School, and worked as a farmer before entering politics on a full-time basis. He was married to Catherine Twomey, and they had nine children. Moynihan first became involved in politics when he was co-opted onto Cork County Council in 1970, taking over his father's seat which the elder Moynihan had held since 1928. Donal Moynihan was first elected to Dáil Éireann at the November 1982 general election. He retained his seat until the 1989 general election, when he lost out to his running mate, Laurence Kelly.

Moynihan regained his seat at the 1992 general election, unseating Kelly in the process and was re-elected at the 1997 and 2002 general elections. In Dáil Éireann, he was a member of the Oireachtas Joint Committee on Heritage and the Irish language, and was also a member of the Joint House Services Committee. He lost his seat at the 2007 general election to party colleague Batt O'Keeffe.

His Aindrias Moynihan was elected as a TD for Cork North-West in 2016. Donal Moynihan died on 29 October 2022.

References

 

1941 births
2022 deaths
Fianna Fáil TDs
Members of the 24th Dáil
Members of the 25th Dáil
Members of the 27th Dáil
Members of the 28th Dáil
Members of the 29th Dáil
Local councillors in County Cork
Irish farmers